Camilo Damián Cándido Aquino (born 2 June 1995) is a Uruguayan footballer who plays as a left-back for Nacional in the Uruguayan Primera División.

References

External links

1995 births
Living people
Uruguayan footballers
Uruguayan expatriate footballers
Rampla Juniors players
San Martín de San Juan footballers
Liverpool F.C. (Montevideo) players
Club Nacional de Football players
Uruguayan Primera División players
Uruguayan Segunda División players
Association football defenders
Footballers from Montevideo
Uruguayan expatriate sportspeople in Argentina
Expatriate footballers in Argentina